Jaffa is part of the city of Tel Aviv in Israel.

Jaffa (or sometimes Jafa and other transliterations from Hebrew or Arabic) may also refer to:

Arts
Jaffa (2009 film), an Israeli drama directed by Keren Yedaya
Jaffa (2013 film), a Telugu black comedy written and directed by Vennela Kishore
Jaffa (Stargate), a fictional race in the military sci-fi television series
Jaffa Phonix, a Palestinian band

Food and drink
Jaffa (soft drink), popular in Scandinavia
Jaffa Cakes, a snack popular in the UK 
Jaffa Crvenka, a Serbian confectionery company
Jaffa orange, a variety of orange originating in Palestine
Jaffas, a confectionery popular in Australia and New Zealand

People
 Harry V. Jaffa, American academic
 Max Jaffa, British violinist
 Jaffa Lam, a Hong Kong visual artist.

Places

Australia
Jaffa, Queensland, a locality in the Cassowary Coast Region
Cape Jaffa, a headland in South Australia
Cape Jaffa Lighthouse, in South Australia

North America
Jaffa, Ontario, a town in Canada
Jaffa Shrine Center, an arena in Pennsylvania, US

Western Asia
County of Jaffa and Ascalon in the Crusader state Kingdom of Jerusalem

Jerusalem
Jaffa Gate, one of the seven main open Gates of the Old City of Jerusalem
Jaffa Road, one of the longest and oldest major streets in Jerusalem
Jaffa Gate Mill, a windmill

Tel Aviv
Old Jaffa, the historical part of Jaffa
Jaffa Port, an ancient port on the Mediterranean Sea
Jaffa Clock Tower
Jaffa Light, a lighthouse
Jaffa Railway Station

Galilee
Yafa an-Naseriyye, or Jaffa of Nazareth

War and diplomacy
Battle of Jaffa (1192), crusader battle with Richard the Lionhart
Battle of Jaffa (1917), World War One battle between forces of the British Empire and Ottoman Empire
Siege of Jaffa, by Napoleon against the Ottomans
Treaty of Jaffa (disambiguation), between the Crusaders and the Saracens

Other uses
Jafa, occasionally "Jaffa", a derogatory term in New Zealand for an Aucklander
Jaffa (cricket), an exceptionally well bowled delivery
The Jaffa Institute, an Israeli social services agency

See also

Jaffe (disambiguation)
Jaffe family
Jaffee
Jofa
Joffa (disambiguation)
Joffe (disambiguation)
Joppa (disambiguation)
Jaffna (disambiguation)
Java (disambiguation)